Moss was an unincorporated community in Gilmer County, West Virginia, United States. Its post office  is closed. It was also known as Murrell.

A large share of the first settlers were from the Moss family, hence the name.

References

Unincorporated communities in Gilmer County, West Virginia
Unincorporated communities in West Virginia